Olivet is an census-designated place and an unincorporated community in Hardin County, Tennessee, that is treated as a census-designated place (CDP) for the 2010 U.S. Census. Olivet is located immediately east of Savannah and is served by Tennessee State Route 203 and Tennessee State Route 226.

The population of the CDP was 1,401 as of the 2020 census.

The community was named after the Mount of Olives.

Demographics

References

Census-designated places in Hardin County, Tennessee
Census-designated places in Tennessee
Unincorporated communities in Tennessee